Bhoj Pandaul or Bhojparaul  is a village situated around 15 km from Madhubani, district headquarters of Madhubani district, Bihar state, India.

The village has an area of 5-6 square kilometers and a population of approximately 8000. The village lies in the Bisfi Block and Bhojpandaul Panchayat. this village has the history of producing great,  talented engineers and educated persons who are making their motherland named bhojpandaul proud. There is a very famous temple of Goddess Durga witch is situated at Dakshin Bai Tola and other deities in this village These statues are centuries old and have archaeological importance & temple is run through Shri Shri 108 Bhagwati Sthan Puja Samiti and temple committee is also run Satsangeet Kirtan Mandali. The villagers also organize massive Durga Puja in temple and devotees coming from far away areas.

References 

Villages in Madhubani district